Iridomyrmex innocens is a species of ant in the genus Iridomyrmex. Described by Forel in 1907, the species is endemic to Australia, mainly confined in Western Australia, but the species is more common in areas with higher rainfalls within the Darling Ranges.

References

Iridomyrmex
Hymenoptera of Australia
Insects described in 1907